A seleninic acid is an organoselenium compound and an oxoacid with the general formula RSeO2H, where R ≠ H. It is a member of the family of organoselenium oxoacids, which also includes selenenic acids and selenonic acids, which are RSeOH and RSeO3H, respectively. The parent member of this family of compounds is methaneseleninic acid (CH3SeO2H), also known as methylseleninic acid or "MSA".

Reactions and applications in synthesis
Seleninic acids (particularly areneseleninic acids) are useful catalysts for hydrogen peroxide epoxidations, Baeyer–Villiger oxidations, oxidations of thioethers, etc.; peroxyseleninic acids (RSe(O)OOH) are thought to be the active oxidants.

Structure, bonding, properties
Methaneseleninic acid has been characterized by X-ray crystallography. The configuration about the selenium atom is pyramidal, with Se-C = 1.925(8) Å, Se-O = 1.672(7) Å, Se-OH = 1.756(7) Å, the angle OSeO = 103.0(3)°, the angle HO-Se-C = 93.5(3)°, and the angle OSeC = 101.4(3)°. The structure is isomorphous to that of methanesulfinic acid 

Benzeneseleninic acid (C6H5SeO2H) had been previously characterized by X-ray methods and its optical resolution reported.

References

Organoselenium compounds